Minor Counties East played in List A cricket matches between 1976 and 1978. This is a list of the players who appeared in those matches.

Steve Atkinson (1978): SR Atkinson
David Bailey (1976–1978): D Bailey
Malcolm Beaty (1978): M Beaty
Peter Birtwisle (1977): PC Birtwisle
Peter Bradley (1976): P Bradley
Bob Cooke (1978): RMO Cooke
Peter Gill (1976–1978): PN Gill
Antony Good (1978): AJ Good
David Hancock (1977–1978): DA Hancock
John Harvey (1976): JF Harvey
Robin Hobbs (1976): RNS Hobbs
John Howarth (1977): JS Howarth
Roger Howlett (1978): RF Howlett
Michael Ikin (1977): MJ Ikin
Steve Johnson (1978): JS Johnson
Peter Johnson (1978): PD Johnson
Peter Kippax (1977): PJ Kippax
Brian Lander (1976–1978): BR Lander
Martin Maslin (1976): M Maslin
John Moore (1977): JD Moore
Tracey Moore (1976): TI Moore
Neil O'Brien (1977–1978): NT O'Brien
Kenneth Pearson (1976–1977): K Pearson
Neil Riddell (1976–1978): NA Riddell
Geoff Robinson (1976–1978): G Robinson
Colin Rutterford (1978): C Rutterford
Doug Slade (1976): DNF Slade
John Sunley (1976–1977): J Sunley
Stuart Wilkinson (1977–1978): JS Wilkinson
Derek Wing (1976–1977): DC Wing

References

List
Minor Counties of English and Welsh cricket